The Midland Railway 1252 class was a class of thirty 0-4-4T locomotives built by Neilson and Company in 1875–1876 to the design of Samuel Waite Johnson. They were a development of the 6 Class. Originally numbers 1262–1281 and 1252–1261. Under the Midland Railway's 1907 renumbering scheme they became 1236–1265.

Construction history
The Midland used nominal  diameter driving wheels for this class, whereas in all later engines (starting with the 1532 Class) they used nominal  diameter wheels. They were given the power classification 1P.

Service history
All but one locomotive passed to the London, Midland and Scottish Railway (LMS) at the 1923 grouping; and nine, Nos 1239/46/47/49/51/52/55/60/61 were still in LMS stock at the end of 1947 and passed to British Railways (BR). BR allocated them numbers 58030–58038, though only three 58033/36/38 received them before withdrawal. All members of the class were withdrawn by 1954, and all were scrapped.

References

Further reading
 Bob Essery and David Jenkinson An Illustrated Review of Midland Locomotives vol 3
 Bob Essery and David Jenkinson An Illustrated History of LMS Locomotives vol 4

1252
0-4-4T locomotives
Railway locomotives introduced in 1875
Neilson locomotives
Standard gauge steam locomotives of Great Britain
Scrapped locomotives